Spooks! is a 1953 short subject directed by Jules White starring American slapstick comedy team The Three Stooges (Moe Howard, Larry Fine and Shemp Howard). It is the 148th entry in the series released by Columbia Pictures starring the comedians, who released 190 shorts for the studio between 1934 and 1959.

Plot
The Stooges are private detectives that are hired to track down a kidnapped girl name Mary Bopper (Norma Randall), daughter of George B. Bopper (Frank Mitchell). They decide to trace Bopper back to where she was last seen, which leads them to mad scientist Dr. Jeckyl (Philip Van Zandt) and his assistant, Mr. Hyde (Tom Kennedy). There is also a gorilla kept imprisoned in the house for experimental purposes. The Stooges arrive to rescue the kidnapped girl disguised as door-to door pie salesmen.

Cast
 Moe Howard as Moe
 Larry Fine as Larry
 Shemp Howard as Shemp and Bat
 Phil Van Zandt as Dr. Jekyll
 Tom Kennedy as Mr. Hyde
 Norma Randall as Bea Bopper
 Steve Calvert as Gorilla (uncredited)
 Frank Mitchell as George B. Bopper (uncredited)

Production notes
Spooks! was the first of two Stooge shorts (the other being Pardon My Backfire) made by Columbia Pictures in 3D, after the 3D craze of 1953 began with Bwana Devil. It originally premiered on May 20, 1953 with the Columbia western Fort Ti (also in 3D). Hence, the lines in the opening scene (addressed to client George B. Bopper, who's awakened the snoozing Stooges):

Moe: We'll be with you before you can say "Fort Ticonderoga."

Larry: If you can say "Fort Ticonderoga."

Both the Columbia 3D Edmond O'Brien thriller Man in the Dark and Spooks! were originally sepia toned in order to allow for more light to pass through the Polaroid filters necessary for the dual-strip 3D projection method of that time. The process did not work as expected and the idea was dropped after these two productions.

This is also the first short in the series filmed for flat wide-screen. Although some films of this period were composed for the Academy aspect ratio and released in wide-screen during the confusion, Spooks! and future releases were composed at 1.85:1, Columbia's house ratio.

Spooks! was filmed on May 11–15, 1953, and released just 31 days after production due to Columbia Pictures' desire to cash in on the 3D craze. Conversely, it took five full days to complete filming, due to the complexity of shots and angle required for 3D viewing. New Stooge films produced at the time generally took no more than three days to complete, with remakes usually being completed in a single day.

In popular culture
Spooks! was one of five Stooge films included in the TBS 1995 Halloween special The Three Stooges Fright Night along with If a Body Meets a Body (1945), We Want Our Mummy (1939), The Hot Scots (1948), and Malice in the Palace (1949).

References

External links 
 
 
Spooks! at threestooges.net

1953 films
1953 comedy films
The Three Stooges films
American black-and-white films
Films directed by Jules White
Mad scientist films
1953 3D films
3D short films
Columbia Pictures short films
American comedy short films
1950s English-language films
1950s American films